Haskell Creek Homesites is a USDA Forest Service Recreational Residence cabin tract in Sierra County, California, United States.

The area, known as the Haskell Creek Summer Home Tract, consists of 34 summer cabins built on Forest Service land. The first F.S. cabin permits were issued for Haskell, and for near-by Carvin Creek, Ramshorn, Wild Plum and Sierra Tracts and Clark Station in 1947. Cabin owners own the cabins. They lease the land from the F.S., and pay an annual fee. The Haskell Creek Tract Association - HCTA - was organized in 1948, to maintain the tract's roads and water supply. Snow generally persists from November to May, limiting access to the Tract to summer use. Snow has arrived as early as September, and has kept the Tract roads closed well into June.

References

Unincorporated communities in California
Unincorporated communities in Sierra County, California